Aradan County is in Semnan province, Iran. The capital of the county is the city of Aradan. At the 2006 census, the region's population (as Aradan District of Garmsar County) was 15,418 in 4,437 households. The following census in 2011 counted 15,575 people in 4,882 households. It was separated from Garmsar County in 2011 to form Aradan County. At the 2016 census, the county's population was 13,884 in 4,919 households.

Administrative divisions

The population history and structural changes of Aradan County's administrative divisions over three consecutive censuses are shown in the following table. The latest census shows two districts, four rural districts, and two cities.

References

 

Counties of Semnan Province